Gia Jishkariani (born 30 November 1967, in Tbilisi) is a former Soviet and Georgian footballer. He is the father of Nikoloz Jishkariani, also a footballer.

Jishkariani started his career for Guria Lanchkhuti in Soviet Top League. He then moved to Dinamo Tbilisi and played the first ever Umaglesi Liga in 1990.

International goals

Honours
 Iberia (Dinamo) Tbilisi
Umaglesi Liga: 1990, 1991, 1991-92
Georgian Cup: 1991–92

External links

Soviet footballers
Footballers from Georgia (country)
Soviet Union under-21 international footballers
Georgia (country) international footballers
Association football midfielders
FC Guria Lanchkhuti players
FC Dinamo Tbilisi players
GKS Katowice players
FC Samtredia players
Soviet Top League players
Erovnuli Liga players
Ekstraklasa players
Expatriate footballers in Poland
Footballers from Tbilisi
1967 births
Living people